Hopewell pottery is the ceramic tradition of the various local cultures involved in the Hopewell tradition (ca. 200 BCE to 400 CE) and are found as artifacts in archeological sites in the American Midwest and Southeast. The Hopewell were located around the Mississippi and Illinois Rivers during the Middle Woodland Period, and the Hopewell Interaction Sphere spanned from the Gulf of Mexico to Ontario, Canada.

Uses
This pottery was used in a variety of ways: from storage and cooking to holding offerings during burial ceremonies. Ceremonial pottery was noticeably more delicate and elaborate than pottery for domestic use.

Techniques
Although there are many techniques and methods of pottery production, the method most likely used in the Hopewell culture was the coiled method. After making the initial form of the vessel a paddle and anvil would then be used to further shape and smooth the pot. The final two steps are decoration and firing.

Before firing, Hopewell pottery was often incised, stamped, or zone-stamped, in which different "zones" of the pot were delineating by incised, then stamped, leaving the surrounding areas smooth for contrast. "Hopewell ware" is characterized by crosshatching, bands with cambered rims, and highly stylized bird motifs.

See also
 Ceramics of indigenous peoples of the Americas
 Fort Ancient culture pottery
 Mississippian culture pottery
 Plaquemine culture pottery
 Visual arts by indigenous peoples of the Americas

Notes

References
Berlo, Janet C. and Ruth B. Phillips. Native North American Art. Oxford: Oxford University Press, 1998. .
Seeman, Mark F. "Hopewell Art in Hopewell Places." Richard F. Townsend and Robert V. Sharp, eds. Hero, Hawk, and Open Hand. New Haven: Yale University Press, 2004. .

Hopewellian peoples
Native American pottery